Fähndrich is a surname. Notable people with the surname include: 

Hartmut Fähndrich (born 1944), German scholar and translator
Hugo Fähndrich (1851–1930), Austrian–Hungarian chess master
Jenny Fähndrich (born 1989), Swiss BMX cyclist
Markus Fähndrich (born 1960), Swiss skier
Nadine Fähndrich (born 1995), Swiss skier

See also
Musée Chappuis-Fähndrich, museum in Develier, Canton of Jura, Switzerland